Nam Đàn is a rural district of Nghệ An province in the North Central Coast region of Vietnam. As of 2003 the district had a population of 158,006. The district covers an area of 294 km². The district capital lies at Nam Đàn.

References

Districts of Nghệ An province